Naanal may refer to:
 Naanal, a 1965 film 
 Naanal, a 2008 TV series